Omar Effendi is an Egyptian chain of government stores, founded in 1856, in Cairo by the Austro-Oudzdi family of Austrian origin under the name "Orosdi Back" in its place which is still located in Cairo, It is owned by the Holding Company for Tourism, Hotels and Trade, one of the companies of the Ministry of Public Business Sector, It has 82 branches in various governorates of the Republic.

History 
The company’s founding dates back to the year 1856 during the reign of Sa'id of Egypt, at the hands of the “Adolphe Orozdy” family in 1905, which it consists of six floors. The company's reputation as one of the most famous commercial chains in the world after it was bought by a wealthy Jewish Egyptian in 1921 and called it "Omar Effendi", until President Gamal Abdel Nasser nationalized it in 1957, and in 1967 witnessed the transformation of the Omar Company Effendi to an Egyptian joint stock company affiliated with the Holding Company for Trade, which no longer exists and its companies were divided into the National Company for Construction and Development and the Holding Company for Trade. And it has the right to participate in the formation of Egyptian or foreign companies that carry out their activities inside or outside, as well as to carry out any activity related to the company’s purposes, and the company continued to work until the Egyptian government began during the era of Hosni Mubarak He blessed the partial privatization of its branches, as part of a broad program to privatize public business sector companies that included more than 140 companies.

In 2004, Omar Effendi branches put to the private sector to participate in the management of some branches in full, such as the Fayoum branch in favor of the Oriental Weavers Company, the Workers’ University branch in favor of the “Ceramics and Chinese Company”, the 26th of July branch for the “Egyptian Center for Engineering and Trade” And Tharwat branch in favor of “Misr Italia Company for Ready-made Garments.” In 2005, the government announced the sale of the company to “Anwal” company owned by Saudi businessman Jamil Al-Qunabit, at a value of 560 million pounds. The decision to sell sparked many criticisms, as its annual sales ranged between 360 and 380 million. Egyptian pounds, which represents 50% of the sales volume it achieved in previous years.

Prior to the 25 January revolution, the Administrative Court of Justice ruled that the company should return to the state, represented by the National Company for Construction and Development, and although the National Company for Construction and Development welcomed Omar Effendi’s return, it confirmed the difficulty of operating it due to the lack of financial liquidity necessary to revive its branches again, as it needs Omar Effendi to pump investments worth more than 500 million Egyptian pounds over a period of 4 years to get out of the loss it suffers, which amounted to about 830 million Egyptian pounds, including 83 million Egyptian pounds for suppliers, and 160 million Egyptian pounds for banks, although the National Company for Construction and Development was She objects to offering the company’s branches to the private sector for operation, but the company’s management has already offered a number of branches, but no one has come forward to rent them due to the accumulation of debts, as well as the existence of an international arbitration dispute between Jamil Al-Qunabit and the Egyptian government.

Photo gallery

See also
 List of supermarket chains in Egypt.
 Economy of Egypt.

References

External links
 Omar Effendi Official website

Government-owned companies of Egypt
1856 establishments
Hypermarkets